Group A of the 2016 Fed Cup Americas Zone Group II was one of two pools in the Americas zone of the 2016 Fed Cup. Four teams competed in a round robin competition, with the top two teams proceeding to the play-offs where they played for promotion to Group I.

Standings

Round-robin

Venezuela vs. Costa Rica

Chile vs. Honduras

Venezuela vs. Chile

Costa Rica vs. Honduras

Venezuela vs. Honduras

Chile vs. Costa Rica

References

External links 
 Fed Cup website

2016 Fed Cup Americas Zone